Marmolata Mountain is a nunatak in the Purcell Mountains of the Columbia Mountains in southeastern British Columbia, Canada.  It was named in 1930 by Eaton Cromwell because he thought it looked similar to the highest of the Italian Dolomites.

References

Three-thousanders of British Columbia
Columbia Valley
Purcell Mountains
Kootenay Land District